Onychipodia is a genus of moths in the subfamily Arctiinae. The genus was erected by George Hampson in 1900.

Species
 Onychipodia flavithorax Rothschild, 1912
 Onychipodia nigricostata Butler, 1894
 Onychipodia straminea Hampson, 1914

References

Lithosiini
Moth genera